Jorge Álvarez (1932 – July 5, 2015) was an Argentine publisher and record producer, considered one of the most important promoters of Argentine culture in the 1960s and 1970s, first in the world of literature and later in the world of music.

In 1963, he founded the publishing house Editorial Jorge Álvarez and later Ediciones de la Flor, from which he released the work of writers like Rodolfo Walsh, Ricardo Piglia, Manuel Puig, Joaquín Lavado, David Viñas, Marta Lynch,  Leopoldo Torre Nilsson and Juan José Saer, as well as the Mafalda comic strip by cartoonist Quino. Between 1963 and 1968, he published around three hundred books that marked "a milestone in Argentine and Latin American literature."

In 1968 he founded the independent record label Mandioca, nicknamed "the kids' mother", which was a great promoter for the burgeoning Spanish-language rock movement. Through this platform, he produced influential Argentine rock artists such as  Manal, Miguel Abuelo, Moris, Vox Dei, Alma y Vida and Tanguito, among others. Later, through the Music Hall and Talent-Microfón labels, he worked with Pescado Rabioso, Sui Generis, Invisible, Color Humano, La Cofradía de la Flor Solar and Billy Bond. 

In 1971, he acted in Edgardo Cozarinsky's 1971 film Puntos suspensivos o Esperando a los bárbaros.
Due to the civil-military dictatorship—which warned him that he was "creating a revolutionary youth"— Álvarez had to go into exile in Madrid in 1977, where he produced Spanish artists such as Antonio Flores, Mecano, Olé Olé, Marta Sánchez and Joaquín Sabina. In 2011 he returned to Argentina and in 2013 he published his memoirs.

He died on July 5, 2015 and a wake took place at the National Library of the Argentine Republic in Buenos Aires.

See also
 Origins of Argentine rock
 Psychedelic rock in Latin America

References

External links

 Ediciones de la Flor, official website
 Pidamos peras a Jorge Álvarez, catalog of an exhibition at the National Library of the Argentine Republic

Argentine record producers
Businesspeople from Buenos Aires
1932 births
2015 deaths